No Fixed Address is the eighth studio album by Canadian rock band Nickelback which features a guest appearance from American rapper Flo Rida and was released on November 14, 2014, via Republic Records. The album was preceded by the lead single "Edge of a Revolution", which was released on August 18, 2014. The album marks a notable change in the band sound, combining their usual post-grunge and hard rock sound with elements of dance-pop and electronic. This also is the band's first and most likely only release on Republic Records, after leaving long-time record label Roadrunner Records in 2013, and then leaving Republic for BMG before the release of their ninth album, Feed the Machine, in 2017.

Background
During an interview on CFOX-FM, Chad Kroeger stated that the band planned to release their eighth studio album before the end of 2014. The lead rock single was also announced, "Edge of a Revolution", which was scheduled to be released sometime in August 2014. The track was described as a 'departure' for Nickelback and a political song. It was also announced that frequent collaborator Chris Lord-Alge will return to mix some of the tracks on the album. It was also announced the band had signed to Republic Records. Chad also hinted that a potential album title was No Fixed Address.

On August 22, 2014, Nickelback announced that the album would be titled No Fixed Address and they released the track listing along with it.

The album title, No Fixed Address, was inspired by the fact that the album was recorded in many different places, and they never settled in a single spot.

Lead singer Chad Kroeger said the album has some songs that are a significant departure from the band's typical musical style, including a song called "Got Me Runnin' Round" that features American rapper Flo Rida and has a horn section in it.

Singles
The lead US rock single from the album is titled "Edge of a Revolution", and was sent for adds on Rock radio on August 18, 2014, and was released to iTunes on August 19.

The lead pop single (second overall) is titled "What Are You Waiting For?". It was premiered on German and UK radio stations on September 4, before being released in Australia on September 5, 2014. It impacted US Hot AC radio stations on September 22, 2014 according to Republic Records' radio site.

The second US rock single (and third single overall) off the album is "Million Miles an Hour".

For the second pop single off of the album, the band decided to do a trio release, with different tracks going to different countries. "Miss You" was released in the United Kingdom on February 16, 2015, "She Keeps Me Up" was released in North America on February 17, 2015, and "Satellite" was released in Europe on March 7, 2015.

"Get 'Em Up" was later announced that the track will be sent for US Rock airplay on May 5, 2015 as the third rock single, and seventh overall single off of the album. It was officially sent for rock adds on June 2, 2015.

It was announced on May 11, 2015, that "Satellite" would be impacting US Hot AC radio on the same day, making it the third pop single in the US. "Satellite" was later announced as the 3rd single in the UK and Ireland on May 21 and was added to the BBC Radio 2 B-List.

On May 17, 2015, it was announced by Virgin Radio Italy that "Make Me Believe Again" was going to be released as a rock single in Italy.

Critical reception

No Fixed Address has currently received a 54/100 review score on Metacritic, based on five reviews.

AllMusic, rating it 3.5 stars out of five, noted favorably that the album is more influenced by EDM than the band's previous work, which reviewer Stephen Thomas Erlewine attributed to a decisive change in style to remain relevant: "It's not only a commercially canny move, it generates the best Nickelback album to date."

Commercial performance
In its first week of release, the album debuted at number two on the Canadian Albums Chart, selling 20,000 copies. This marks the band's first official studio album not to debut at number one on the chart, falling behind One Direction's Four. As of January 2015, No Fixed Address has sold 58,000 copies in Canada. The album was certified platinum by Music Canada for sales of over 80,000 copies in Canada. In UK, it became their first studio album since "The States" to miss the top 10 of the chart, despite receiving a Silver certification later.

In the US, the album debuted at number four on the US Billboard 200 and number one on the US Top Rock Albums chart selling 80,000 copies in its first week. Debut sales for the album were less than the debut of the band's previous album, Here and Now, which saw 227,000 copies sold in its first week.

Track listing
The track listing of the album was revealed on August 22, 2014. The track list changes were confirmed on their website on October 29, 2014.

Notes
 signifies an additional producer

Personnel
Nickelback
Chad Kroeger – lead vocals, lead guitar, rhythm guitar
Ryan Peake – rhythm and occasional lead guitar, keyboards, backing vocals
Mike Kroeger – bass
Daniel Adair – drums, backing vocals

Additional
Ali Tamposi – backing vocals (track 4)
Dave Martone – backing vocals (track 7)
Flo Rida – guest vocals (track 10)
Michael Sanders – guitar (track 10)
Jerry Hey – horn arrangement (track 10)
Natalie Cassidy – trumpet (track 10), waffle (track 11)
Steve Holtman – trombone (track 10)
Dan Higgins – saxophone (track 10)
Melanie Taylor, Kenna Ramsay – backing vocals (track 10)

Production
Producer: Chris Baseford
Mixing: Chris Lord-Alge, except track 1 mixed by Randy Staub
Mastering: Ted Jensen

Charts

Weekly charts

Year-end charts

Certifications

Release history

Appearances
 The song "Edge of a Revolution" was featured in the video game Guitar Hero Live in 2015. The song "Get 'Em Up" was later included in the game in 2016.

References

Nickelback albums
2014 albums
Republic Records albums